The , commonly known in Japanese as Rekihaku, is a history museum in Sakura, Chiba, Japan. The museum was founded in 1981 as an inter-university research consortium, and opened in 1983. The collections of museum focus on the history, archaeology, and folk culture of Japan.

See also
 List of National Treasures of Japan (ancient documents)
 List of National Treasures of Japan (writings)

References 

History museums in Japan
National museums of Japan
Museums in Chiba Prefecture
Museums established in 1981
1981 establishments in Japan
Sakura, Chiba